Nick Moody (born January 29, 1990) is a former American football inside linebacker. He was selected by the San Francisco 49ers in the sixth round of the 2013 NFL Draft. He played college football at Florida State University and played safety and linebacker. He was also a member of the Pi Kappa Alpha fraternity.

Professional career

San Francisco 49ers 
On April 27, 2013, Moody was selected with the 12th pick on the sixth round (180 overall) by the San Francisco 49ers. On May 10 Moody signed a four-year contract with the team. After breaking his hand in a week 1 victory over the Green Bay Packers, Moody was placed on injured reserve/recall on September 11. On November 12, 2013, the 49ers activated Moody.

On September 5, 2015, Moody was waived by the 49ers.

Seattle Seahawks 
Moody signed to the practice squad of the Seattle Seahawks on September 12, 2015. On October 14, he was promoted to the Seahawks' active roster. On November 24, he was placed on injured reserve.

Washington Redskins
On December 13, 2016, Moody was signed by the Washington Redskins. He was waived on December 23.

References

External links
San Francsico 49ers bio
Florida State Seminoles bio

1990 births
Living people
American football linebackers
American football safeties
Florida State Seminoles football players
Players of American football from Pennsylvania
San Francisco 49ers players
Seattle Seahawks players
Sportspeople from Montgomery County, Pennsylvania
Washington Redskins players